The Connecticut Critics Circle is an organization of reviewers, feature writers, columnists, and broadcasters throughout Connecticut, Massachusetts, Rhode Island, and New York. It was founded in 1990

Mission statement
"To honor the actors, directors, designers and others who help make professional Connecticut theater so outstanding. ... The organization's members also meet to discuss issues regarding theater criticism. Additionally, it invites prominent guest speakers to address the membership in meetings that are open to the public."

Awards
Their annual awards are considered prestigious

The Tom Killen Memorial Award "is bestowed upon those who have made extraordinary contributions to Connecticut's Equity professional theater."  Gordon Edelstein won that award, among others, including Outstanding Director of a Play for Uncle Vanya in 2007.

Jeff Kready received a Connecticut Critics Circle Nomination for Outstanding Supporting Actor in a Musical,.

Jeremy Jordan was nominated in 2008 for his role as Alex in The Little Dog Laughed at Hartford Theatreworks

Joyce Ebert earned a special achievement award in 1996 for "30 years of outstanding contribution to a theater in Connecticut."

David Esbjornson

Frank Ferrante for his portrayal of Captain Spalding in Animal Crackers at Goodspeed Opera House

References

1990 establishments in Connecticut
Art criticism
Critics associations
Organizations established in 1990